Im So-eun (born October 7, 1996), better known as NC.A (initialism for New Creative Artist), is a South Korean singer and actress, She debuted in August 2013 with "My Student Teacher". She was last active as a member of South Korean girl group Uni.T, until their disbandment in September 2018.

Personal life
NC.A was born on October 7, 1996.

She attended the Osan Middle School and attended Hanlim Multi Art School and graduated in February 2015.

Career

Pre-debut
Towards her graduation in junior high school, she started going to a music academy. She performed there and someone had it video-taped and uploaded online. The video ended up in the hands of Chae Jong-ju, the CEO of JJHolic Media who later called her in for an audition. Upon passing the auditions, she became a trainee.

In 2012, she performed in a concert of her label mate Yurisangja.

2013: Debut with My Student Teacher and Oh My God 
On August 11, 2013, NC.A released her debut digital single "My Student Teacher". The song, which lyrics talked about high school life, was composed by Park Seung-hwa of Yurisangja, written by Lee Ji-won and edited by Seo Jung-jin, which presented Lee Hye-ri.

She portrayed the role of a high school student in tvN's Reply 1994. The drama's producing director Shin Won-ho saw a pre-debut photo and asked her to audition for the drama.

On November 15, she released her second single "Oh My God", this time she appeared in the music video.

2014: Scent of NC.A, Crazy You & Hoo Hoo Hoo
On March 21, 2014, NC.A released her digital single "Hello Baby". Following this single, NC.A released her first mini-album on April 9.
Along with Sungwon from A-Prince, NC.A will be an MC of the new music show Ranking Reformat which will air from Monday to Friday at 12AM KST. The premiere was on April 7. On the same date, the teaser of the MV "I'm Different" was released on NC.A's Official YouTube channel. On April 9,  they released the music video for "I'm Different".

On 28 August NC.A posted on Twitter a message announcing she would release a new single on 2 September.

On 2 September NC.A released a pre-release single "Crazy You" featuring Sims of MIB as a surprise for fans and also their upcoming studio album, NC.A released the music video on 20 September.

On 18 December NC.A released the MV for Hoo Hoo Hoo.

2015–present: Multiple solo singles & The Unit

On 31 December NC.A posted the teaser for her new single "Coming Soon" on her YouTube channel, announcing that it would come out 5 January. Coming Soon is a song about a girl who wants to confess her feelings to the boy she's been admiring. She held her debut stage of "Coming Soon" on KBS's Music Bank 2 January. The song and MV were released 5 January. "Coming Soon" is NC.A's first try at rapping since her debut.

On 21 February NC.A announced that she would be coming back with a ballad song on March.

Through NC.A's official Facebook and Twitter it was announced on 25 March that the following day she would release her new single Cinderella Time and they posted the concept images. The single and MV were released on 26 March and in the MV Sungjae from BTOB and Dino from Halo appear.

It was announced that NC.A would make her comeback on July  Through her official Facebook, NC.A posted a teaser for Vanilla Shake showing her in a short haircut and later posted that it would be released the 20th of the same month.

On 20 July NC.A released her new song Vanilla Shake and Jeong Jae Yong and NS Yoon-G were featured in the MV.

She released the OST "Instinct" for the drama The Law of the Jungle on the 23rd.

NC.A was cast in the drama Three by Three together with Fiestar's Jei and Dal Shabet's Jiyul.

Through the project to fund albums Makestar, NC.A released her first Korean studio album Time to Be A Woman that will be released in October, 2016.

In October 2017, NC.A participated on South Korean survival reality show, The Unit. The concept of the show is to form male and female unit groups of nine members each, among idols who had already debuted. On the last episode NC.A ranked #3, thus making her one of the nine members of the temporary girlgroup Uni.T.

Discography

Studio albums

Extended plays

Singles

As lead artist

As featured artist

Collaborations

Soundtrack appearances

Videography

Music videos

Music Video Appearances

Filmography

Variety Shows

Drama

TV Programs
 2014: Ranking Reformat 8

Notes

References

External links
 Official website
 NC.A's Twitter
 NC.A's Instagram

1996 births
Living people
MBK Entertainment artists
People from Osan
South Korean women pop singers
South Korean television actresses
Hanlim Multi Art School alumni
South Korean female idols
Uni.T members
21st-century South Korean singers
21st-century South Korean women singers